Alex Aldi is an American, New York City-based record producer and mixing engineer, who has worked with bands such as Passion Pit, Magic Man, and Holy Ghost!.

Discography

2014
Magic Man - Before the Waves - Producer, Engineer, Mixing (Neon Gold/Columbia Records)
Tiny Victories - Haunts - Producer, Engineer, Mixing (The Sleepover Party)

2013
Gentlemen Hall - All Our Love (Single) - Mixing, Addl. Production (Island Records)
Passion Pit - Constant Conversations EP - Mixing, Addl. Production (Columbia Records)
Magic Man - You Are Here - Producer, Engineer, Mixing (Neon Gold/Columbia Records)
Wildcat! Wildcat! - EP - Mixing (Downtown Records)
Down With Webster - One In A Million (Single) - Mixing (Universal/Motown)
Futurbrite - Part I EP - Mixing (Self-Released)
Hands - Synesthesia - Mixing (Kill Rock Stars)

2012
Passion Pit - Gossamer - Mixing, Engineer, Addl. Production (Columbia Records)
Passion Pit - Twilight: Breaking Dawn Pt.2 - Producer, Engineer, Mixing (Atlantic Records/Chop Shop)
The Hundred in the Hands - Come With Me (Single) - Mixing (Warp Records)

2011
Holy Ghost! - Holy Ghost! - Mixing, Engineer (DFA)
Outasight - Figure 8 EP - Mixing (Warner Bros)
We Barbarians - Headspace EP - Mixing (Beranimal)
The Chain Gang of 1974 - The Wayward Fire - Mixing (Warner Bros/Modern Art Records)

2010
Holy Ghost! - Static On The Wire (DFA) - Mixing, Engineer
Suckers - Wild Smile (Frenchkiss Records) - Mixing, Engineer
The Hundred in the Hands - The Hundred in the Hands (Warp) - Mixing, Engineer
Shy Child - Liquid Love (Wall Of Sound) - Mixing, Engineer

2009 
Theophilus London - "Humdrum Town 12" (Green Label Sounds) - Mixing
Chapel Club - "Surfacing" (Polydor) - Mixing
Passion Pit - "Manners" (Frenchkiss Records/Columbia) - Mixing, Engineer
Pepper Rabbit - "Shakes EP" (self released) - Mixing
Les Savy Fav - "Score! 20 Years Of Merge Records" (Merge Records) - Mixing
Harlem Shakes - "Technicolor Health" (Gigantic Music) - Mixing, Engineer
The Rakes - "Klang!" (V2 Records) / Universal Records - Mixing
The Hundred in the Hands - "Dressed In Dresden" [single] (Pure Groove) - Mixing, Engineer
Asobi Seksu - "Hush" (Polyvinyl) - Engineer

2008 
The Walkmen - "You & Me" (Gigantic Music) - Engineer
Tokyo Police Club - "Elephant Shell" (Saddle Creek) - Engineer
Bridges and Powerlines - "Ghost Types" (Citybird Records) - Mixing
Frances - "All The While" (Gigantic Music) - Mixing, Engineer

2007 
Les Savy Fav - "Let's Stay Friends" (Frenchkiss Records) - Engineer
Gregor Samsa - "Rest" (Kora) - Engineer
White Rabbits - "Fort Nightly" (Say Hey Records) - Mixing
White Rabbits - "Cotillion Blues" [single] (Gigantic Music) - Mixing
The Boggs - "Forts" (Gigantic Music) - Mixing Engineer
Ghastly City Sleep - "Ghastly City Sleep" (Robotic Empire) - Producer, Mixing, Engineer
Shy Child - "Noise Won't Stop" (Kill Rock Stars) - Engineer
Aa - "GAame" (Gigantic Music) - Asst. Engineer
Dragon's Of Zynth - "Xerathyn" [single] (Gigantic Music) - Asst. Engineer
My Best Fiend - "Acid Happy" [single] (Gigantic Music) - Asst. Engineer
Asobi Seksu - "Stay Awake" [single] (Gigantic Music) - Asst. Engineer
Harlem Shakes - "Burning Birthdays" (self-released) - Asst. Engineer

2006 
Asobi Seksu - "Citrus" (Friendly Fire Records) - Asst. Engineer
Human Television - "Look Who You're Talking To" (Gigantic Music)- Asst. Engineer
Trick & The Heartstrings - "We're The Hardest" [single] (Good & Evil) - Asst. Engineer

References 

Living people
American record producers
Year of birth missing (living people)